is a passenger railway station in located in the town of Komono,  Mie Prefecture, Japan, operated by the private railway operator Kintetsu Railway.

Lines
Komono Station is a station on the Yunoyama Line, and is located 11.3 rail kilometers from the  opposing terminus of the line at Kintetsu-Yokkaichi Station.

Station layout
The station consists of an island platform and a side platform serving three tracks. This makes it possible for trains running in opposite directions one the single-line Yunoyama Line to pass each other at this station. Platform 3, for use by dead-head trains is no longer in use.  Passengers going between the station entrance and platform 2 must cross the train tracks via a level crossing.

Platforms

Adjacent stations

History
Komono Station opened on June 1, 1913, as a station on the Yokkaichi Railway. Due to mergers, station fell under the ownership of the Mie Railway on March 1, 1931, and under the Sangu Express Electric Railway (Sanco) on February 11, 1944. On February 1, 1964, the railway division of Sanco split off into a separate company, which came under the ownership of the Mie Electric Railway. The Mie Electric Railway became part of the Kintetsu group on April 1, 1965. Support for PiTaPa and ICOCA began on April 1, 2007.

Passenger statistics
In fiscal 2019, the station was used by an average of 1380 passengers daily (boarding passengers only).

Surrounding area
Komono High School
Komono Public Hospital
Japan National Route 306
Japan National Route 477

See also
List of railway stations in Japan

References

External links

Kintetsu: Komono Station 

Railway stations in Japan opened in 1913
Railway stations in Mie Prefecture
Stations of Kintetsu Railway
Komono